Darla (1975–1992) was a Bichon Frise best known for her acting role as Precious in the 1991 thriller The Silence of the Lambs, a film which earned the Big Five Academy Awards. Darla acted in several other films, including Batman Returns (1992).

Career and popularity
Darla began her career in the 1985 film Pee-wee's Big Adventure as Pink Poodle, and appeared in 1989's The 'Burbs starring Tom Hanks. Her most notable role was as Precious in 1991's The Silence of the Lambs. Darla became a cult icon due to the film's success and was the subject of a Facebook fan page titled "Precious". Her final role was in 1992's Batman Returns, as Ratty Poodle.

Notable scenes
In Silence of the Lambs, the following famous quote by serial killer Buffalo Bill (Ted Levine) was punctuated by a bark from Precious as he held her in his arms: “It rubs the lotion on its skin, or else it gets the hose again!” The scene demonstrates that, despite his total disregard for human life, Bill did care for the little dog, which is further evidenced by the small doggy bed next to his sewing machine. Later in the film, Buffalo Bill's intended next victim, Catherine, manages to lure Precious into the well where she is being held captive, stalling Buffalo Bill long enough for help to arrive. The dog is again seen after the ordeal, still being held by Catherine as she is put in an ambulance.

In Batman Returns, Darla's last film appearance, she is credited as "Ratty Poodle", but because her fur was purposely roughed-up for the part she is barely recognizable. In one scene, The Penguin and his crew show up to confront Batman. One member of the crew is a blonde woman dressed in Victorian-era style clothing, and she is carrying Darla. In this movie, Darla is portrayed as a major nuisance for Batman. Darla ran to catch Batman's self-operating Batarang, used by his enemies in an attempt to frame him in the murder of the Ice Princess, thus confounding The Penguin's plan.

Darla retired to Thousand Oaks, California, in 1992, and died later that year at the age of 16 or 17.

Life
Darla worked with trainer Christie Miele in The Silence of the Lambs, according to whom Darla's "big thing" was stealing socks. She was extremely smart and loved everyone. Darla loved being around people. As published in Comic Book Resources, "Although many won't recall Darla's impact on these films, there's no denying that her skills as an actor have linked two excellent movies and proved that she was one of the best dogs of her time."

In the 2021 sequel television series, Clarice, the role of Precious was taken up by a bichon frise named Kendall.

Filmography
 Pee-wee's Big Adventure (1985) as Pink Poodle
 The 'Burbs (1989) as Queenie
 The Silence of the Lambs (1991) as Precious
 Batman Returns (1992) as Ratty Poodle

Television
 Coach (1990) as Watkin's Poodle
 Eerie, Indiana (1991) as Fifi

See also
 List of individual dogs

References

External links

1975 animal births
1992 animal deaths
Dog actors